Grimes is a surname that is believed to be of a Scandinavian, English, or Irish descent.

Notable people with the surname "Grimes"

A
Alexander Grimes (born 1965), English cricketer
Alison Lundergan Grimes (born 1978), American politician
Anne Grimes (1912–2004), American journalist
Aoibhinn Grimes (born 1976), Canadian field hockey player
Ashley Grimes (disambiguation), several people
Ashley Grimes (footballer, born 1957) (born 1957), former Irish footballer
Ashley Grimes (footballer, born 1986) (born 1986), English footballer

B
Bernard Grimes, American table tennis player
Betty Grimes (1899–1976), American diver
Billy Grimes (1927–2005), American football player
Brent Grimes (born 1983), American football player
Brittney Grimes, American poet
Bryan Grimes (1828–1880), American general
Burleigh Grimes (1893–1985), American baseball player

C
Cameron Grimes (born 1993), American professional wrestler
Camryn Grimes (born 1990), American actress
Carol Grimes (born 1944), British singer-songwriter
Charles Grimes (disambiguation), several people
 Charles Grimes (surveyor) (1772–1858), English surveyor in colonial Australia
 Charles Grimes (rower) (1935–2007), American rower
Chelcee Grimes (born 1992), British singer-songwriter
Christine Grimes (born 1950), British lawn bowler
Christine Grimes (rower), British rower
Christopher M. Grimes (born 1948), Bermudian artist
Connor Grimes (born 1983), American field hockey player

D
David Grimes (disambiguation), multiple people
David Grimes (American football) (born 1986), American football wide receiver
David Grimes (composer) (born 1948), American composer
David Grimes (politician) (born 1953), American politician from Alabama
David Grimes (physician) (born 1947), American physician and abortion provider
David Robert Grimes (born 1985), physicist and cancer researcher at the University of Oxford
David Grimes (meteorologist), Canadian meteorologist
Darren Grimes (born 1993), British political commentator
Denis Grimes (1864–1920), Irish sportsperson
Doris Grimes (1909–1987), British diver
Don Grimes (1937–2021), Australian politician
Dylan Grimes (born 1991), Australian rules footballer

E
Éamonn Grimes (born 1947), Irish hurler
Ed Grimes (1905–1974), American baseball player
Edward Grimes (disambiguation), multiple people
Edward Grimes (politician) (c.1811–1859), Victorian MLC
Edward Grimes (singer) (born 1991), one of the Irish singing twins known as Jedward
Elizabeth A. Grimes (born 1954), American judge

F
Frances Grimes (1869–1963), American sculptor
Steve Grimes (born 1947), Irish actor

G
Gary Grimes (born 1955), American actor
Gassaway Sellman Grimes (1816–1875), American physician
Ged Grimes (born 1962), Scottish musician
George Grimes (disambiguation), multiple people
 George Grimes (American football) (1922–1971), NFL football player for the Detroit Lions
 George Grimes (English politician) (1605–1657), member of parliament and Royalist
 George Grimes (Queensland politician) (1835–1910), Queensland MLA
 George F. Grimes (1877–1929), businessman and political figure in Newfoundland

H
Hamil Grimes (born 1956), Barbadian sprinter
Henry Grimes (1935–2020), American musician
Howard Grimes (born 1941), American drummer

J
Jack Grimes (disambiguation), multiple people
 Jack Grimes (actor) (1926–2009), American actor
 Jack Grimes (footballer) (born 1989), Australian rules footballer
James Grimes (disambiguation), multiple people
James W. Grimes, American statesman
James Grimes (soccer) (born 1968), Canadian striker
James Walter Grimes (born 1953), American botanist
James Grimes, involved in the St Kilda Road robberies
Jamie Grimes (born 1990), English footballer
Jane Brown Grimes (1941–2021), American sports administrator
Jason Grimes (born 1959), American long jumper
Jeff Grimes (born 1968), American football coach
Jesse Grimes (1788–1866), American politician
John Grimes (disambiguation), multiple people
Dr. John Grimes (1802–1875), Quaker anti-slavery advocate
John Grimes (New Zealand bishop) (1842–1915), first Roman Catholic bishop of Christchurch, New Zealand
John Grimes (bishop) (1852–1922), Roman Catholic bishop
John Bryan Grimes (1868–1923), North Carolina Democratic politician and farmer
John Grimes (baseball) (1869–1964), American baseball player
John Grimes (priest) (1881–1976), Anglican Archdeacon of Northampton
John Grimes, former U.S. Assistant Secretary of Defense for Networks and Information Integration (2005-2009)
John Grimes (singer) (born 1991), member of the Irish pop rap duo Jedward
Jonathan Grimes (born 1989), American football player
Joseph Rudolph Grimes (1923–2007), Liberian politician

K
Karolyn Grimes (born 1940), American actress
Katie Grimes (born 2006), American swimmer
Ken Grimes (born 1947), American artist
Kevin Grimes (disambiguation), several people
 Kevin Grimes (ice hockey) (born 1979), retired Canadian ice hockey player
 Kevin Grimes (soccer) (born 1967), former U.S. soccer defender
Kylie Grimes (born 1987), British para-athlete

L
Leonard Grimes (1815–1873), American pastor
Louis Arthur Grimes (1883–1948), Liberian judge
Louise Grimes (1907–1990), Australian musician
Luke Grimes (born 1984), American actor

M
Mark Grimes, Canadian politician
Martha Grimes (born 1931), American writer
Marty Grimes (born 1962), American skateboarder
Mason Grimes (born 1992), Guamanian footballer
Matt Grimes (born 1995), English footballer
Michael Grimes (disambiguation), several people
 Michael Grimes (investment banker) (born 1966), American technologist and banker
 Michael Grimes (scientist) (1888–1977), Irish professor of microbiology
Mickey Grimes (born 1976), American sprinter

N

Nate Grimes (born 1996), American basketball player in the Israeli Basketball Premier League
Nikki Grimes (born 1950), American author
Norman Grimes (born 1998), American athlete

O
Oona Grimes (born 1957), British artist
Oscar Grimes (1915–1993), American baseball player

P
Paul Grimes (disambiguation), multiple people
 Paul Grimes (criminal) (born 1950), English former gangster
 Paul Grimes (public servant), Australian public servant
Phil Grimes (1929–1989), Irish hurler

Q
Quentin Grimes (born 2000), American basketball player

R
Rachael Grimes, British army officer
Randy Grimes (born 1960), American football player
Ray Grimes (1893–1953), American baseball player
Reggie Grimes (born 1976), American football player
Robin Grimes, English physicist
Roger Grimes (born 1950), Canadian politician
Roy Grimes (1893–1954), American baseball player

S
Sandra Grimes (born 1945), American intelligence officer
Scott Grimes (born 1971), American actor
Shenae Grimes (born 1989), Canadian-American actress
Solomon Grimes (born 1987), Liberian footballer
Stephen Grimes (disambiguation), several people
 Stephen B. Grimes (1927–1988), English production designer and art director
 Stephen H. Grimes (1927–2021), American lawyer and jurist
Stuart Grimes (born 1974), Scottish rugby union footballer

T
Tammy Grimes (1934–2016), American actress and singer
Thomas Grimes (disambiguation), one person apart from Tom Grimes
Thomas Wingfield Grimes (1844–1905), American politician
Tilly Grimes, British costume designer
Tinsley Grimes, American actress
Tiny Grimes (1916–1989), American guitarist
Tom Grimes, American novelist
Trevon Grimes (born 1998), American football player

V
Vic Grimes (born 1970), American professional wrestler
Vince Grimes (born 1954), English footballer

W
Warren G. Grimes (1898–1975), American entrepreneur
W. F. Grimes (1905–1988), British archaeologist
William Grimes (disambiguation), multiple people
 William C. Grimes (1857–1931), American politician and businessman
 William Grimes (journalist) (born 1959), wrote for The New York Times
 W. F. Grimes (1905–1988), Welsh archaeologist
 William Grimes (footballer) (1886–?), with Bradford City and Derby County
 William Grimes (ex-slave) (1784–1865), author
 William P. Grimes (1868–1939),  American politician in Wisconsin
Willie Grimes (disambiguation), multiple people

Fictional characters
Carl Grimes, in the comic book and television series The Walking Dead
Frank Grimes, from the animated sitcom The Simpsons 
John Grimes, in a series of novels by A. Bertram Chandler
John Grimes, in the film Black Hawk Down
Lori Grimes, in the comic book and television series The Walking Dead
Morgan Grimes, in the television series Chuck
Rick Grimes, in the comic book and television series The Walking Dead

See also
Grimes (disambiguation), a disambiguation page for "Grimes"